Put On a Happy Face may refer to:

"Put On a Happy Face" (song) from 1960 American musical Bye Bye Birdie
Put On a Happy Face (album) by Oscar Peterson Trio, recorded in 1962